The 2011 President's Cup is the 61st season of the President's Cup, a knock-out competition for Maldives' top 4 football clubs. VB Sports Club are the defending champions, having defeated Victory Sports Club in last season's final.

Broadcasting rights

The broadcasting rights for all the matches of 2011 Maldives President's Cup were given to the Television Maldives.

Qualifier
Top 4 teams after the end of 2011 Dhivehi League third round will be qualified for the President's Cup.

Final qualifier

Semi-final Qualifier

Semi-final

Final

Statistics

Scorers

Assists

References
 President's Cup 2011 at RSSSF

External links
 Discussions to play President's Cup final in Addu Stadium at Sun Sports
 2011 FA Cup Final match preview: Victory vs New Radiant at Sun Sports

President's Cup (Maldives)
Pres